The 1999 Torneo Internazionali Femminili di Palermo was a women's tennis tournament played on outdoor clay courts in Palermo, Italy that was part of the Tier IV Series of the 1999 WTA Tour. It was the 12th edition of the Internazionali Femminili di Palermo and took place from 12 July until 18 July 1999. Qualifier Anastasia Myskina won the singles title.

Entrants

Seeds

Other entrants
The following players received wildcards into the singles main draw:
  Maria Paola Zavagli
  Flora Perfetti

The following players received wildcards into the doubles main draw:
  Flavia Pennetta /  Adriana Serra Zanetti

The following players received entry from the singles qualifying draw:

  Miroslava Vavrinec
  Anastasia Myskina
  Alice Canepa
  Giulia Casoni

The following players received entry to the singles main drawn as a lucky loser:

  Samantha Reeves
  Patty Van Acker

The following players received entry from the doubles qualifying draw:

  Joannette Kruger /  Li Fang

The following players received entry to the doubles main draw as a lucky loser:

  Nina Nittinger /  Magüi Serna

Finals

Singles

 Anastasia Myskina defeated  Ángeles Montolio, 3–6, 7–6(7–3), 6–2
It was Myskina's first WTA final and career title.

Doubles

 Tina Križan /  Katarina Srebotnik defeated  Giulia Casoni /  Maria Paola Zavagli, 4–6, 6–3, 6–0

References

External links
 ITF tournament edition details
 Tournament draws

Torneo Internazionali Femminili di Palermo
Torneo Internazionali Femminili di Palermo
Internazionali Femminili di Palermo
Torneo